The Ministry of Education and Science is a central executive body of the Government of Kazakhstan, which manages and within the limits provided for by law, intersectoral coordination in the fields of education, science, protection of children's rights and youth policy.

In 2022 Ministry devided  as the Ministry of High Education and Science and Ministry of Education .

History 
The Ministry of Education of the Republic of Kazakhstan is the state authority performing management in the spheres of education, science, protection of children's rights. Minister of education of the Republic of Kazakhstan - Beisembayev Gani Bektaevich (since 2023). 

Ministry of Science and Higher Education of the Republic of Kazakhstan minister -  Sayassat Nurbke (Since 2022)

Functions 
 ensuring compliance with the constitutional rights and freedoms of citizens in the field of education;
formation of priority directions of fundamental and applied scientific research in the Republic of Kazakhstan;
implementation of education management, methodological and methodological support of the quality of educational services provided by organizations;
conducting state youth policy;
development and introduction to the statement of the Government of the Republic of Kazakhstan programs for the implementation of the State Youth Policy;
implementation of international cooperation in the field of science and youth policy;
development of various programs to implement the basic rights of the child;
implementation of intersectoral coordination in the field of education and science;
negotiations with foreign partners and the signing of international treaties (agreements) and educational programs, as well as scientific activities;
coordination of the activities of the Central and Local Executive Bodies of the Republic of Kazakhstan in the field of state youth policy;
approval of the procedure and criteria for competitive selection and the holding of a competition of universities that introduce innovative educational programs;
approval of the rules of organization and implementation of educational and methodical work;
approval of the rules for organizing the educational process on credit technology of training and remote educational technologies;
the organization of foreign events of republican significance;
development and approval of the sectoral system of promotion;
establishing order of direction for learning abroad;
approval of the rules of translation and restoration of students in the types of educational organizations;
implementation of information support for the education management system;
development of regulatory legal acts in the field of state youth policy;
determination of the method of certification of students;
approval of the charters of subordinate educational institutions.

References

1999 establishments in Kazakhstan
Education
Ministries established in 1999